Gangubai is a female name in the Indian subcontinent.

Gangubai Hangal,  Gangubai Hangal (  Hindi: गंगुबाई  हंगल) a Noted Indian  classical singer of the Kirana Gharana.
Saloni Daini, aka 'Gangubai' 8 year old Indian Comedy Star, famous for her Gangubai act
Gangubai Kothewali (1939-2008), a former brothel owner in Mumbai

See also 
 Gangubai Kathiawadi, a film based on the life of Gangubai Katiawadi